Bill McCowen (born 31 March 1937) is a British bobsledder. He competed in the two-man and the four-man events at the 1964 Winter Olympics.

References

1937 births
Living people
British male bobsledders
Olympic bobsledders of Great Britain
Bobsledders at the 1964 Winter Olympics
Place of birth missing (living people)